Den svenska psalmboken – antagen av 1986 års kyrkomöte is the fourth official hymnal of the Church of Sweden.

The process to create a new hymnal began in earnest in 1958 when Rune Pär Olofsson published a critique of the existing 1937 hymnal. The new hymnal was approved at the general conference of the Church of Sweden on August 29, 1986.

References

Lutheran hymnals